Mordellistena atrogemellata is a species of beetle in the genus Mordellistena of the family Mordellidae. It was described in 1965 and can be found in Bulgaria, Greece, and Republic of Macedonia.

References

atrogemellata
Beetles described in 1965
Beetles of Europe